Nagarjuna is an Indian actor, producer and television presenter who works primarily in Telugu cinema and television. He has received nine state Nandi Awards, three Filmfare Awards South and a National Film Award-Special Mention. He received his first National Film Awards during 1996 as he produced, Ninne Pelladata, which has garnered the National Film Award for Best Feature Film in Telugu for that year. His performance in Annamayya received a National Film Award – Special Mention (Actor) in the 45th National Film Awards in 1998.

CineMAA Awards 
The CineMAA Awards are presented annually by Movie Artists Association Group, a television network based in Hyderabad.

Filmfare Awards South 
The Filmfare Awards South is the South Indian segment of the annual Filmfare Awards, presented by The Times Group to honour both artistic and technical excellence of professionals in the South Indian film industry. The awards are separately given for Kannada, Tamil, Telugu and Malayalam films.

Nandi Awards 
The Nandi Awards are the awards that recognize the excellence in Telugu cinema, Telugu theatre and Telugu television, and Lifetime achievements in Indian cinema. Presented annually by the Government of Andhra Pradesh.

National Film Awards 
The National Film Awards are awarded by the Government of India's Directorate of Film Festivals division for achievements in the Indian film industry. Nagarjuna has received two awards.

South Indian International Movie Awards 
The South Indian International Movie Awards are rewards the artistic and technical achievements of the South Indian film industry.

IIFA Utsavam

Other awards

See also
Nagarjuna
Akkineni Nagarjuna filmography

Notes

References

External links
 

Lists of awards received by Indian actor